Richard Alan Orkin (July 9, 1933 – December 24, 2017) was an American voice actor and commercial radio producer who created the Chickenman radio series and The Secret Adventures of the Tooth Fairy. His voice was used in many radio advertisements and public-service announcements.

Biography
Born in Williamsport, Pennsylvania, Orkin received his Bachelor of Arts degree in speech and theater from Franklin & Marshall College. He received a master's degree in clinical psychology from the Phillips Graduate Institute, and attended Yale Drama School, studying for a Master of Fine Arts degree in theater.

Orkin began working in advertising in Chicago in 1963. He gained acclaim with his comedy radio commercials (until 1982 in collaboration with Bert Berdis) for Time magazine, GMAC, the Gap and other clients.  His radio spots, mini dramas dubbed by Newsweek as "The Advertising Theater of the Absurd", won many awards.

Orkin and Christine Coyle co-wrote two animated specials for CBS, Christmas Every Day and The Canterville Ghost. Orkin and Coyle are the founders of Radio Ranch.

Orkin died of a hemorrhagic stroke in Thousand Oaks, California, at the age of 84.

Honors and awards
Orkin was inducted into the National Radio Hall of Fame, the NAB Broadcasting Hall of Fame, the Illinois Broadcasters Hall of Fame, the Pennsylvania Broadcasters Hall of Fame and the Radio Advertising Bureau Hall of Fame.

On January 21, 2010, Orkin wrote to the National Association of Broadcasters, requesting them to remove his name from the Hall of Fame, because he did not wish to share the honor with radio talk show host Rush Limbaugh. According to Orkin, Limbaugh showed "reckless insensitivity" with his remarks regarding the 2010 Haiti earthquake. Orkin referred to Limbaugh as a "dangerous hate-monger" and a "perfidious human being".

References

External links
Billboard June 5, 1982 Yesterday's Deejay Heroes: Where Are They Now? Pages 28 & 31

1933 births
2017 deaths
Franklin & Marshall College alumni
Yale School of Drama alumni
American male voice actors
American radio personalities
People from Williamsport, Pennsylvania
Male actors from Pennsylvania